Heimat is a 1938 German historical drama film directed by Carl Froelich and starring Zarah Leander, Heinrich George and Ruth Hellberg. The film's melodramatic storyline portrays the return of a leading singer to her hometown, where her father wishes her to settle down and marry. It is based on the 1893 play Heimat by Hermann Sudermann.

It was shot at the Tempelhof Studios in Berlin. The film's sets were designed by the art directors Franz Schroedter and Walter Haag.

Froelich won the award for best director at the 1938 Venice Film Festival for this film.

Synopsis
The opera singer Maddalena had been cast out by her family after they learned she was to bear the child of a banker von Keller who had seduced and abandoned her.  Her return to her native city has her father warn her to remain away, because she is a threat to her family, and her sister Marie's wedding.  However, von Koller threatens the reputation of her family with an underhanded banking scheme.  He commits suicide, and Maddalena is reconciled with her family.

Cast
 Zarah Leander as Maddalena Dall'Orto
 Heinrich George as Leopold Dall'Orto Schwartze
 Ruth Hellberg as Marie
 Lina Carstens as Fränze von Klebs
 Paul Hörbiger as Franz Heffterdingk
 Georg Alexander as Ludwig Prinz von Imlingen
 Leo Slezak as Rohrmoser
 Hans Nielsen as Max von Wendlowsky
 Franz Schafheitlin as Bankdirektor von Keller
 Ernst Schiffner

References

Bibliography

External links

1938 films
Films of Nazi Germany
1930s German-language films
Films directed by Carl Froelich
German films based on plays
Films based on works by Hermann Sudermann
Films set in the 1880s
German black-and-white films
1930s historical drama films
German historical drama films
UFA GmbH films
Films shot at Tempelhof Studios
1938 drama films
1930s German films